True Colours is the sixth studio album released by New Zealand band Split Enz, and was their first major commercial success. Released on 21 January 1980, the album featured more pronounced contributions from co-lead singer and songwriter Neil Finn than previous releases. The album's New Zealand and Australian number 1 single, "I Got You", which also broke them internationally, is credited to him. The US release of the album featured "Shark Attack" and "I Got You" in reversed positions due to the latter's success on the single charts.

Details
Tim Finn said, "We had been playing so many shows, so the band were very tight. It was like everything was starting to line up to make a really powerful record." Crombie added, "We'd had a rough time up to that in England, and I think we're really just raring to go. We came back to Melbourne and recorded the album and it just felt it was a new beginning."

Originally, the band thought "Missing Person" to be the album's standout track, not realizing "I Got You" would become the hit. "I Hope I Never" was mixed differently for the Australian single release, with strengthened percussion. "Nobody Takes Me Seriously", "What's the Matter with You" and "Poor Boy" were released as singles in the northern hemisphere.

A synthesizer melody played in "I Wouldn't Dream of It" was first introduced in an early Split Enz recording, aptly titled "The Instrumental".

Cover
The album cover was initially released in four colour combinations – yellow and blue, red and green, purple and yellow, and blue and orange – but would ultimately be given another four makeovers with releases in lime green and pink, hot purple and burnt orange, gold and platinum (to mark its sales milestones), and finally yellow, blue and red.

Crombie later said, "There was a lot of resistance initially. For some reason they thought people would get confused. It was just playing with it really. Why not? In the end there were 11 covers. The rarest one is the black and white one that got sent out to the press. There's about 100 of them, with Textas to colour your own. So, if you're really keen, you'll have 11."

When it was later released on the A&M label, imaginative shapes and patterns covered the vinyl using a technique known as "laser-etching". When light hit the record, these designs would protrude and spin about the room. The album was the first to ever use this technique, originally designed to discourage the creation of counterfeit copies.

Reissues
True Colours was remastered by Eddie Rayner and re-released on two occasions. Firstly in 2003, and yet again with the rest of the Split Enz catalogue on 20 May 2006 with the bonus tracks "Things" and "Two of a Kind". In October 2010, the album was listed at number 22 in the book, 100 Best Australian Albums, despite Split Enz being a New Zealand group.

On the 40th anniversary of the release in 2020, the album was remixed by Rayner, reissued as True Colours: 40th Anniversary Mix and reached number one on the New Zealand Albums chart again.

Critical reception
Reviewed in Roadrunner at the time of release, it was described as, "a thoughtful, reflective album. The approach to songs is more straight forward, more serious, than the Split Enz we are all used to."

Crombie later said, "I think we split our audience to some extent. It seemed like a real sort of dividing point. Suddenly we had a lot of teenage girls in our audience and it moved into a different kind of vibe in terms of live performance.” Tim Finn agreed, "If you were a Mental Notes freak, you might have taken a step back at that point."

Track listing

NOTE: On the A&M version (SP-4822), tracks 1 and 2 are inverted. The listing above is the original Mushroom (AUS) / Polydor (NZ) listing.

2006 re-release

40th anniversary remix edition (2020)

12–18 are CD bonus tracks.

Personnel

Split Enz
Tim Finn – vocals, acoustic guitar
Neil Finn – vocals, guitar
Noel Crombie – vocals, percussion
Malcolm Green – drums
Nigel Griggs – bass guitar
Eddie Rayner – keyboards

Production
 David Tickle – producer

Charts

Weekly charts

Year-end charts

Certifications and sales

NB: The album is "multi platinum" in New Zealand.

See also
 List of Top 25 albums for 1980 in Australia

References

Split Enz albums
1980 albums
A&M Records albums
Mushroom Records albums
Albums produced by David Tickle